The 1938 Santa Clara Broncos football team was an American football team that represented Santa Clara University as an independent during the 1938 college football season. In their third season under head coach Buck Shaw, the Broncos compiled a 6–2 record and outscored opponents by a total of 97 to 26. They were ranked as high as No. 5 in the AP Poll before losing the last two games of the season.

Santa Clara tackle Alvord Wolff was a consensus first-team selection for the 1938 College Football All-America Team. Wolff was selected by the Chicago Cardinals with the 16th overall pick of the 1939 NFL Draft.

Schedule

References

Santa Clara
Santa Clara Broncos football seasons
Santa Clara Broncos football